Agwu Nsi (known as Agwo Nsi in the Americas) is the Arusi of divination.

References

Igbo gods
Health gods
Oracular gods